Wadajir District, also called Medina District or Madina District is a district in the south-central Banaadir region of Somalia. A few southwestern neighborhoods of Mogadishu are located in this district, as well as the Somali National University. Also the former US Embassy, now a refugee camp called Siliga Amerikanka (translated American  fence/enclosure), and the former Jaalle Ziyad Military Academy, now used by the AMISOM Brunidan Military Contingent is situated in the district.

Ahmed Abdulle Afrah succeeded Ahmed Hassan Daaci as district commissioner on 25 April 2014; Daaci had served for eight years. Wadajir means together in Somali.

References

Districts of Somalia

External links

Administrative map of Wadajir District

Districts of Somalia
Banaadir